The Hongqi H7 is a four-door executive sedan that is manufactured by the Chinese manufacturer FAW under the Hongqi marque. It is the successor to the Hongqi HQ3 built between 2006 and 2010.

Overview
The H7 was first presented to the public at the Beijing Motor Show in April 2012, and officially went on sale at the end of May 2013. The first 500 Hongqi H7 vehicles had been sold before launch to the Chinese government.

2016 facelift
At the Beijing Motor Show 2016, Hongqi presented a revised version of the H7. In addition, a plug-in hybrid version was presented.

News of a second generation model surfaced in 2019. However, the actual model launched later was named the Hongqi H9 which was more upmarket and sold alongside the H7.

References

External links

Official website

H7
2010s cars
Limousines
Flagship vehicles
Full-size vehicles
Rear-wheel-drive vehicles
Cars of China